Squire: The Financial Planning Simulation is a 1984 video game published by Blue Chip Software.

Gameplay
Squire: The Financial Planning Simulation is a game in which the player is an investor who can invest in the stock market, commodities, real estate, bonds, collectibles, money market accounts, IRAs, oil and gas exploration, and cattle feeding.

Reception
Johnny Wilson reviewed the game for Computer Gaming World, and stated that "Squire is an excellent simulation within a series of excellent simulations. As a game, it is slower moving than Tycoon and Millionaire, but faster paced than Baron."

References

External links
Review in PC World
Article in Family Computing
Review in GAMES Magazine
Article in MacUser
Review in Electronic Games
Article in Creative Computing

1984 video games
Apple II games
Business simulation games
Classic Mac OS games
Commodore 64 games
DOS games
Video games developed in the United States
Video games set in the United States